Edgar Entereso Tadeo is a Filipino comic book artist, born in Taytay, Rizal in November 1974. He is a colorist and inker, and practicing penciller.

His works in coloring include High Roads with his friend Leinil Francis Yu, and District X and Silver Surfer for Marvel Comics. He primarily uses digital painting techniques. He was also involved in the coloring for three of the Pugad Baboy books which were produced in collaboration with the Alamat Comics group.

His inking includes a run on Wolverine with Yu, and several works for DC Comics and Image Comics.

Tadeo has a Philippine-based self-published book entitled Jacara Zar.

External links
Ed Tadeo - Online Portfolio
Jacara Zar - self-published comics entitled Jacara Zar.
PaDrawing.com - Comics Commissions by Edgar Tadeo

Filipino comics artists
Comics inkers
Comics colorists
1974 births
Living people
Artists from Rizal